Münsterberg may refer to:
 Hugo Münsterberg (1863–1916), German-American psychologist
 Münsterberg illusion
 Duchy of Münsterberg, a duchy of Silesia, existing from 1321/1322 to 1742
 Ziębice (formerly Münsterberg), a town in Lower Silesia